Federal Government Girls' College, Abuloma is a girls' secondary school in Abuloma, Port Harcourt, Rivers State, established in 1975.

History
Federal Government Girl’s College, Abuloma was set up in 1974 and opened in 1975, in Bokokiri, Port Harcourt with 34 students, 8 teachers and 14 non-teaching staff. The first principal was Mrs. Okobi.

As part of an expansion in 1976, the school moved to another site in Abuloma.

In 1987, the school was affected by unrest.

Between 2006 and 2010, the Senior Secondary School and the Junior Secondary School were run separately.

Notable alumni
Judith Amaechi, former First Lady of Rivers State
Agbani Darego, model and beauty queen
Muna, rapper
Boma Ozobia, lawyer

References

Girls' schools in Rivers State
Secondary schools in Rivers State
Schools in Port Harcourt
Educational institutions established in 1975
1975 establishments in Nigeria
Secondary schools in Nigeria
Government schools in Nigeria